Apparat can mean:

 The bureaucratic apparatus, staffed by Apparatchiki, in the Soviet Union
 Apparat (musician), Sascha Ring, a German electronic musician
 Apparat Organ Quartet, an Icelandic band
 Apparat Singles Group, a fictional comic book publisher

See also
 Aparat, an Iranian video sharing service